The 1974 Oakland Athletics season involved the A's winning their fourth consecutive American League West title with a record of 90 wins and 72 losses. In the playoffs, the A's defeated the Baltimore Orioles in the ALCS for their third straight AL pennant, and in the World Series, the first ever played entirely on the West Coast, defeated the Los Angeles Dodgers in five games to take their third consecutive World Series championship. Paid attendance for the season was 845,693.

In early 1974, owner Charlie Finley tried to sell the team with an asking price of $15 million.

Offseason 
 November 3, 1973: Horacio Piña was traded by the Athletics to the Chicago Cubs for Bob Locker.
 December 12, 1973: Rico Carty was released by the Athletics.
 February 22, 1974: Reggie Jackson won an arbitration case for a $135,000 salary for the season, nearly doubling his previous year's $70,000.

Regular season 
 June 5, 1974: Outfielders Billy North and Reggie Jackson engaged in a clubhouse fight at Detroit's Tiger Stadium Jackson injured his shoulder, and catcher Ray Fosse, attempting to separate the combatants, suffered a crushed disk in his neck, costing him three months on the disabled list.

The pinch runner 
In 1974, "Hurricane" Herb Washington was tapped by Oakland owner Charlie Finley to become the A's "designated runner." Despite having no professional baseball experience, and having last played baseball in high school, Washington was signed to a major league contract prior to the season. His major league debut was on April 4, 1974, against the Texas Rangers. Appearing as a pinch runner for Joe Rudi in game two of the 1974 World Series, Washington was picked off first base in a crucial ninth-inning situation by Dodgers' reliever Mike Marshall.

Season standings

Record vs. opponents

Opening Day starters 
Sal Bando
Vida Blue
Bert Campaneris
Reggie Jackson
Ángel Mangual
Billy North
Joe Rudi
Gene Tenace
Manny Trillo

Notable transactions 
 May 10, 1974: Dal Maxvill was signed as a free agent by the Athletics.
 June 5, 1974: Rick Lysander was drafted by the Athletics in the 19th round of the 1974 Major League Baseball Draft.
 August 19, 1974: Pat Bourque was traded by the Athletics to the Minnesota Twins for Jim Holt.

Roster

Player stats

Batting

Starters by position 
Note: Pos = Position; G = Games played; AB = At bats; H = Hits; Avg. = Batting average; HR = Home runs; RBI = Runs batted in

Other batters 
Note: G = Games played; AB = At bats; H = Hits; Avg. = Batting average; HR = Home runs; RBI = Runs batted in

Pitching

Starting pitchers 
Note: G = Games pitched; IP = Innings pitched; W = Wins; L = Losses; ERA = Earned run average; SO = Strikeouts

Other pitchers 
Note: G = Games pitched; IP = Innings pitched; W = Wins; L = Losses; ERA = Earned run average; SO = Strikeouts

Relief pitchers 
Note: G = Games pitched; W = Wins; L = Losses; SV = Saves; ERA = Earned run average; SO = Strikeouts

Postseason

ALCS 

The Athletics defeated the Baltimore Orioles, 3 games to 1.

1974 World Series

Summary

Awards and honors 
 Rollie Fingers, World Series Most Valuable Player Award
 Catfish Hunter, P, American League Cy Young Award

All-Stars 
1974 Major League Baseball All-Star Game
 Bert Campaneris, shortstop, starter
 Reggie Jackson, outfield, starter
 Sal Bando, reserve
 Rollie Fingers, reserve
 Catfish Hunter, reserve
 Joe Rudi, reserve

Farm system

References

External links
1974 Oakland Athletics team page at Baseball Reference
1974 Oakland Athletics team page at www.baseball-almanac.com

Oakland Athletics seasons
Oakland Athletics season
American League West champion seasons
American League champion seasons
World Series champion seasons
Oakland